Zoya is a 1944 Soviet biographical war film directed by Lev Arnshtam. It was entered into the 1946 Cannes Film Festival.

Plot
The film depicts the short life of a Moscow schoolgirl Zoya Kosmodemyanskaya who at the beginning of the Great Patriotic War became a partisan-infiltrator and was executed by the Germans in November 1941 near Moscow in a village Petrishcheva. She was posthumously awarded the title Hero of the Soviet Union.

Cast
Galina Vodyanitskaya as Zoya Kosmodemyanskaya
Tamara Altseva as Zoya's Teacher
Aleksey Batalov
Anatoli Kuznetsov as Boris Fomin
Rostislav Plyatt as German Soldier
Boris Podgornij as German Officer
Vera Popova
Boris Poslavsky as Owl
Nikolai Ryzhov as Zoya's Father
Yekaterina Skvortsova as Zoya as a child (as Katya Skvortsova)
Kseniya Tarasova as Zoya's Mother
Yekaterina Tarasova as Katya Tarasova
Vladimir Volchek as Komsomol Secretary

References

External links

1944 films
1944 drama films
1940s biographical drama films
1940s war drama films
Soviet biographical drama films
Russian biographical drama films
Russian black-and-white films
Soviet war drama films
Russian war drama films
1940s Russian-language films
Soviet black-and-white films
Films directed by Lev Arnshtam
Eastern Front of World War II films
Films set in Russia
Films scored by Dmitri Shostakovich
Russian World War II films
Soviet World War II films